Matthew Brown Hammond (1868 – 1933) was an American economist. He was a professor of economics and sociology at Ohio State University since 1904.

Hammond earned a bachelor's degree from the University of Michigan in 1891, and PhD in economics from Columbia University in 1898.

Bibliography

References

External links 
 

1868 births
1933 deaths
American economists
University of Michigan alumni
Columbia Graduate School of Arts and Sciences alumni
Ohio State University faculty
Presidents of the American Economic Association